The 2001 Spanish Formula Three Championship was the first Spanish Formula Three season. It began on 27 May at Circuit Ricardo Tormo in Valencia and ended on 11 November at Circuit de Catalunya in Montmeló after fourteen races. Ander Vilariño was crowned series champion.

Teams and drivers
 All teams were Spanish-registered. All cars were powered by Toyota engines, Dallara F300 chassis and Dunlop tyres.

Calendar

Standings

Drivers' standings
Points were awarded as follows:

Teams' standings 
Points were awarded as follows:

References

External links
 Official Site

Formula Three season
Euroformula Open Championship seasons
Spanish
Spanish Formula 3